Phani Majumdar was a pioneering Indian film director, who worked in Hindi cinema, most known for his film Street Singer (1938) starring K.L. Saigal noted for its song, Babul Mora Naihar Chhooto Jaye, Meena Kumari classic Aarti (1962) and Oonche Log (1965). He also worked in Singapore, where he notably made Hang Tuah (1955) in Malay, which was nominated for the Golden Bear at the 7th Berlin International Film Festival.

Career
Starting in 1930s, with leading film director P.C. Barua at New Theatres Studio of Calcutta founded by B. N. Sircar, who during this period made classics like Devdas (1935). He moved to Bombay in 1941 and worked with Bombay Talkies studio, he made Tamanna (1942) with Suraiya and Mohabbat (1943) with Shanta Apte and Andolan (1951).  He made films in Punjabi, Magadhi (Bhaiya, 1961) and Maithili (Kanyadaan, 1965). His Oonch Log was actor Feroz Khan's first hit and won the National Film Award for Second Best Feature Film .

Noted film director-producer Shakti Samanta assisted Majumdar in Tamasha, Baadbaan and Dhobi Doctor at Bombay Talkies before working independently.

He was married to Monica Desai, sister of actress, Leela Desai.

Filmography

Note:Films in Hindi-language unless mentioned otherwise.

Awards
National Film Awards
1961: All India Certificate of Merit for the Second Best Children's Film - Savitri
1965: Second Best Feature Film: Oonch Log

References

External links
 

1911 births
1994 deaths
Hindi-language film directors
Bengali Hindus
Indian male screenwriters
People from Faridpur District
20th-century Indian film directors
Malay-language film directors
Hindi screenwriters
Directors who won the Best Children's Film National Film Award
20th-century Indian screenwriters
20th-century Indian male writers